Lily usually refers to herbaceous plants of the genus Lilium, with large showy trumpet-shaped flowers. Many species are cultivated as ornamentals.

Many other plants not closely related to lilies are called lilies, usually because their flowers resemble lilies. They include:-

 African lily, Agapanthus africanus
 Amazon lily, Eucharis species
 Arum lily, Araceae, Arum species
 Autumn zephyrlily, Zephyranthes candida
 Aztec lily, Sprekelia species
 Bead lily:
 Clintonia
 Clintonia andrewsiana
 Clintonia borealis
 Clintonia uniflora
 Belladonna lily, Amaryllis
 Blackberry lily, Belamcanda
 Blood lily:
 Haemanthus
 Scadoxus
 Blue lily:
 Agapanthus praecox
 Nymphaea caerulea
 Nymphaea violacea
 Stypandra glauca (nodding blue lily)
 Thelionema caespitosum (tufted blue lily)
 Triteleia grandiflora
 Bluebead lily:
 Clintonia
 Clintonia andrewsiana
 Clintonia borealis
 Clintonia uniflora
 Bonnet lily, Nuphar
 Bugle lily, Watsonia
 Bush lily, Clivia species
 Calla lily, Zantedeschia aethiopica
 Candelabra lily, Brunsvigia josephinae
 Chocolate lily:
 Dichopogon strictus
 Fritillaria biflora
 Fritillaria camschatcensis
 Fritillaria lanceolata
 Clinton's lily, Clintonia
 Cobra lily:
 Arisaema species
 Darlingtonia californica
 Copperlily, Habranthus species
 Corn lily:
 Clintonia borealis
 Ixia
 Veratrum
 Cornish lily, Nerine bowdenii
 Crimson flag lily, Hesperantha coccinea 
 Daylily (or Day lily), Hemerocallis
 Easter lily, Lilium longiflorum
 Fawn lily, Erythronium
 Flag lily, Hesperantha species
 Flax lily:
 Dianella (plant)
 Phormium
 Forest lily, Veltheimia bracteata
 Fortnight lily, Dietes bicolor
 Foxtail lily, Eremurus robustus
 Fringe lily, Thysanotus
 Giant Himalayan lily, Cardiocrinum giganteum
 Giant spear lily, Doryanthes palmeri
 Ginger lily:
 Alpinia
 Hedychium
 Guernsey lily:
 Nerine bowdenii
 Nerine sarniensis
 Gymea lily, Doryanthes excelsa
 Hedgehog lily, Massonia depressa
 Henderson's fawn lily, Erythronium hendersonii
 Jacobean lily, Sprekelia species
 Jersey lily, Amaryllis belladonna
 Josephine's lily, Brunsvigia josephinae
 Kaffir lily:
 Clivia miniata
Hesperantha coccinea
 Lent lily, the wild daffodil Narcissus pseudonarcissus
 Lily of the Incas, Alstroemeria psittacina
 Lily of the Nile, Agapanthus praecox
 Lily of the valley, Convallaria majalis
 Mariposa lily, Calochortus
 Natal lily, Clivia miniata
 Nodding blue lily, Stypandra glauca
 Paintbrush lily, Haemanthus coccineus
 Paradise lily, Paradisea
 Parrot lily, Alstroemeria psittacina
 Peace lily, Spathiphyllum
 Peruvian lily, Alstroemeria
 Peruvian swamp lily, Zephyranthes candida
 Pineapple lily, Eucomis
 Pink lily leek, Allium oreophilum
 Pond lily, Nuphar
 Rain lily: 
 Habranthus
 Cooperia
 Zephyranthes
 Resurrection lily, Lycoris squamigera
 River lily:
 Crinum pedunculatum
 Hesperantha coccinea
 St. Bernard's lily, Anthericum liliago
 St. Bruno's lily, Paradisea liliastrum
 Sand lily:
Leucocrinum
Pancratium maritimum
Veltheimia capensis
 Scarborough lily, Cyrtanthus elatus
 Siberian fawn lily, Erythronium sibiricum
 Spear lily, Doryanthes palmeri
 Speckled wood-lily, Clintonia umbellulata
 Spider lily:
 Crinum
 Hymenocallis
 Lycoris (plant)
 Spoon lily, Alocasia brisbanensis
 Surprise lily, Lycoris squamigera
 Swamp lily, Crinum pedunculatum
 Tasman flax lily, Dianella tasmanica
 Tinsel lily, Calectasia
 Toad lily, Tricyrtis species
 Torch lily, Kniphofia
 Trailing lily, Bomarea multiflora
 Trout lily, Erythronium
 Tufted blue lily, Thelionema caespitosum
 Vanilla lily, Arthropodium
 Water lily or waterlily:
 Nymphaea
 Nymphaeaceae
 White rain lily, Zephyranthes candida
 Yellow trout lily, Erythronium americanum